Bebeli (Beli), or Kapore, is an Austronesian language of West New Britain, Papua New Guinea.

References

External links 
 Kaipuleohone has an open access archive of Bebeli language.

Arawe languages
Languages of West New Britain Province